The Cook reed warbler (Acrocephalus kerearako) or Cook Islands reed warbler, is a species of Old World warbler in the family Acrocephalidae. It is native to the southeastern Cook Islands. Its natural habitats are subtropical or tropical dry forests, swamps, and rural gardens. It is threatened by habitat loss.

Subspecies 
 A. k. kaoko Holyoak, 1974 – Mitiaro
 A. k. kerearako Holyoak, 1974 – Mangaia

References 

Cook reed warbler
Birds of the Cook Islands
Cook reed warbler
Taxonomy articles created by Polbot